The Roman Catholic Diocese of Valle de la Pascua is a diocese located in the city of Valle de la Pascua in the Ecclesiastical province of Calabozo in Venezuela.

History
The Diocese was established as Diocese of Valle de la Pascua, split from the Diocese of Calabozo on 25 July 1992.

Ordinaries
Joaquín José Morón Hidalgo (1992.07.25 – 2002.12.27)
Ramón José Aponte Fernández (2004.03.05 – present)

See also
Roman Catholicism in Venezuela

References

External links
 GCatholic.org
 Catholic Hierarchy 

Roman Catholic dioceses in Venezuela
Roman Catholic Ecclesiastical Province of Calabozo
Christian organizations established in 1992
Roman Catholic dioceses and prelatures established in the 20th century
1992 establishments in Venezuela
Valle de la Pascua